The Huichon University of Telecommunications is located in Huichon, Chagang, North Korea, founded on  September 1, 1959.

It is equipped with TV broadcasting equipment, computers, and electronic facilities and materials for education and scientific research.

It has faculties such as an electric communication engineering faculty, computer controlling engineering faculty, electronics faculty and wireless communication engineering faculty. It has also an electronics institute and other institutes, laboratories, a postgraduate course, a library, a practice workshop and a printing house.

Ninety-five percent of the teaching staff are holders of academic degrees and titles.

See also 
 List of universities in North Korea

Footnotes

Universities in North Korea
1959 establishments in North Korea
Telecommunications organizations
Telecommunication education
20th-century architecture in North Korea